is a Japanese politician of the New Komeito Party, a member of the House of Councillors in the Diet (national legislature). A native of Yawatahama, Ehime and graduate of Keio University, he was elected to the House of Councillors for the first time in 2007 after working at IBM.

References

External links 
 Official website in Japanese.

Members of the House of Councillors (Japan)
People from Yawatahama, Ehime
Keio University alumni
1954 births
Living people
IBM employees
New Komeito politicians